"Buttons" is a song recorded by American girl group the Pussycat Dolls from their debut studio album PCD (2005). It was written by Sean Garrett, Jamal Jones, Jason Perry and group member Nicole Scherzinger, and produced by the former two alongside Ron Fair. It is a hip hop-influenced pop and R&B track featuring synthesizers and a Middle Eastern rhythm, with the group pleading a reluctant man to help them undress whilst adopting a submissive stance. A remix version featuring American rapper Snoop Dogg was released as the album's fourth single on April 11, 2006, by A&M Records and Interscope Records. 

Contemporary music critics criticized "Buttons" for its production, though it was featured on 2006 year-end lists by Rolling Stone and Vibe. A commercial success, the song reached number one in Austria, Hungary and New Zealand, where it became the group's fourth consecutive number-one. It also peaked within the top ten in 12 other countries, including the UK Singles Chart and US Billboard Hot 100, where it peaked at number three. With "Buttons" selling two million digital copies in the US, the Pussycat Dolls became the first girl group in digital history to have three singles cross that mark. The single has been certified platinum by the Recording Industry Association of America (RIAA).

The accompanying music video, directed by filmmaker Francis Lawrence, is an ode to the group's burlesque origin and features multiple dance sequences, including a Bollywood-inspired routine towards the end. It received two nominations at the 2006 MTV Video Music Awards, ultimately winning one for Best Dance Video. To further promote "Buttons", the group performed the song during several television programs and awards shows, including Fashion Rocks and the 2006 American Music Awards, where clips from their performances went viral in 2020, for the perceived tension between Scherzinger and Melody Thornton onstage. The song was featured on the Ubisoft game Just Dance 2022.

Writing and production 
"Buttons" was written and produced by Sean Garrett and Jamal "Polow da Don" Jones, with additional writing by Jason Perry and the group's lead singer Nicole Scherzinger, and additional production by Ron Fair. According to Garrett, "Buttons" was conceived in a short amount of time, with Scherzinger in mind saying: "[she] is very sexy so the concept of loosening up her buttons,—every guy would want that and women wouldn't have a problem with guys loosening up their buttons." Moreover, he credits PCD executive producer Jimmy Iovine for "[pushing] me to be creative and the more creative I am, the more he likes it." Fair and Young Smoke handled the vocal and additional production respectively with Tal Herzberg being credited as a co-producer. Herzberg also operated Pro-Tools and engineering along with J.D. Andrew and Mike "Angry" Eleopoulos, with the assistance of Ariel Chobaz.

"Buttons" was mixed by Dave Pensado at the Larrabee Sound Studios in Burbank, California, where the tracks where handed to him at different stages. Trans-X Multi plug-in was used on the loop to give it a more transient feeling. Scherzinger's lead vocals were processed through Line 6's Echo Farm by adding distortion. Pensado wanted to give Scherzinger's voice more edge without the need to scream over the microphone. The leads' vocal delay was formed by Tel-ray Variable Delay and is within the 16th range. For the effects of the lead vocals, Pensado wanted to minimize the use of effects, and give them a "chorus-like sound" through Waves' Metaflanger.

"Buttons" was included on PCD as the fifth track. Following the success of "Don't Cha" and "Beep", which featured American rappers Busta Rhymes and will.i.am respectively, Snoop Dogg was recruited for its single release. Scherzinger confirmed the collaboration at the Grammy Style Studio event in February 2006. They first collaborated at the 2005 Radio Music Awards, where the Pussycat Dolls performed "Santa Baby"; as part of the "racy rendition", Snoop Dogg joined them onstage dressed as Santa Claus.

Music and lyrics 

"Buttons" runs for a total of three minutes and 52 seconds, and is composed in  time and the key of D minor, with a moderate groove of 102 beats per minute. It is a pop and R&B song with elements of hip hop. Influenced by Timbaland's early works with Indian music, production consists of Middle Eastern music elements, drum loop, "snaky" synthesizers, electric violin, and percussion.

The Pussycat Dolls' vocal range spans from the low note of G3 to the high note of A4, with members Scherzinger adopting breathy vocals and Melody Thornton providing ad-libs. The group takes a submissive stance towards Snoop Dogg who "seems to be as the object of affection for the girls, who ask him to 'loosen up [our] buttons' and to not 'leave [us] asking for more'."

Release
The remix version of "Buttons" featuring rapper Snoop Dogg was released on April 11, 2006, via digital download, as the fourth single from PCD. The song also impacted US contemporary hit and rhythmic radio formats on May 8, through A&M Records and Interscope Records. The remix, subtitled "Final Edit Version", was included on the tour edition of PCD later that year.

Critical reception 
In his review of PCD, Spence D. of IGN commented that the Middle Eastern elements in "Buttons" may be "familiar and funky, but it doesn't present anything new to the realm of female soul pop." Writing for Sputnikmusic, Nick Butler deemed "Buttons" as "enjoyable enough," but felt it "doesn't work as well as ['Don't Cha and 'Beep'], and sonically [is] not far from being all over the place." Slant Magazine's Sal Cinquemani described the song as "degrading material" noting "[they] are a bit easier to swallow thanks, in part, to the group's cartoonish image." Miriam Zendle of Digital Spy was unimpressed with "Buttons" labelling "as awful as [their] debut single, 'Don't Cha'," adding the song's sexual vibe "leaves the listener feeling somewhat sullied." Sean Fennessey of Pitchfork criticized Dogg's appearance for his "indolent" verse. On the contrary, a writer for Vibe magazine favored the song for "[oozing] sexuality." Rolling Stone highlighted the song's chorus, labelling it as "hot", and Snoop Dogg's appearance. Chris Courtney of Chicago Tribune described "Buttons" as a "summer sizzler." Kelley Carter of the Detroit Free Press commented that the song is a "the kind of song that makes the clubbers go crazy."

Accolades

Rankings

Awards and nominations

Commercial performance 
In the United States, "Buttons" was the highest debut of the week on the Billboard Hot 100 dated May 27, 2006, debuting at number 71. It eventually peaked at number three in September 2006, and spent a total of 30 weeks on the chart. On Billboard's component charts, it peaked atop the Hot Dance Club Songs and Mainstream Top 40, and at numbers three and four on the Dance/Mix Show Airplay and Rhythmic charts, respectively. In January 2010, "Buttons" surpassed digital sales of two million units, following "Don't Cha" and "When I Grow Up", making the Pussycat Dolls the first girl group in history to have three songs achieve that feat. In July 2007, the song received a platinum mastertone certification from the Recording Industry Association of America (RIAA) for ringtone sales of one million units. A month earlier, "Buttons" received a BDS Certified Spin Award for receiving 300,000 radio spins in the US. For Snoop Dogg's 40th birthday, Erika Ramirez of Billboard included "Buttons" at number four on the list of "Snoop Dogg's Top 10 Billboard Hits".

In Australia, "Buttons" peaked at number two on the ARIA Singles Chart and was certified platinum by Australian Recording Industry Association (ARIA) for sales of 70,000 units. In New Zealand, "Buttons" entered the singles chart at number 38 solely based on airplay. In its third week, the song climbed 31 places and displaced Gnarls Barkley's "Crazy" from number-one, becoming the chart's 501st number-one song and the group's fourth consecutive number-one, following "Don't Cha", "Stickwitu" and "Beep". "Buttons" logged their twelfth week at the top, becoming the most successful new act in local chart history. It also gave Snoop Dogg's second number-one, after "Drop It Like It's Hot" (2004). It was certified gold by Recording Industry Association of New Zealand (RIANZ), denoting sales of 7,500 copies. It also reached the peak in Austria and Hungary.

On the UK Singles Chart, "Buttons" debuted at number 11 in June 2006. Following its physical release, the song peaked at number three, selling 25,718 units and giving the Pussycat Dolls their fourth consecutive top-three hit. In October 2019, the song was certified gold by the British Phonographic Industry (BPI) for track-equivalent sales of 400,000 units. The Official Charts Company (OCC) ranks "Buttons" as their fifth most successful song on the UK Singles Chart, and the 73rd best-selling song by a girl group. The single also reached number three in Scotland and Switzerland, number four in Belgium (Flanders), Germany, Ireland, and Slovakia, number six in Belgium (Wallonia) and the Netherlands, and number eight in the Czech Republic.

Music video 
Francis Lawrence directed the music video for "Buttons" on the week of March 20, 2006, over a period of three days. During an interview with the New York Post  Scherzinger said that the group was to return to their burlesque roots. "We wanted to go back to the roots of the Dolls, go with the corset vibe and have it be a little rawer and hotter." In a behind-the-scenes footage included on their live album PCD Live from London (2006), member Kimberly Wyatt agreed saying, "so, for our fifth video, we decided to turn it up a notch. It was time to see, what we are all about. Tom Breihan of The Village Voice described the accompanying music video as a "big, glossy pop video" that consists of "flashy editing, decent choreography, [and] a distinct look." The video include routines within a tunnel and a Bollywood-esque dance routine towards the end. Samantha Friedman of VH1 described the dance routine as "intriguing and sexy and sassy."

The video begins with Snoop Dogg performing his rap while Scherzinger dances around him seductively. As the first chorus begins, the group, dressed in suggestive black outfits, walking towards a tunnel where they later perform a striptease. As the second chorus begins, they are seen performing upon a horizontal bar. Towards the end of the chorus, Scherzinger separates herself from the group and performs against a backdrop of curtains made from jewelry then proceeds to dance around a chair. Before the chorus begins, four additional chairs and the group performs a dance routine. Melody Thornton is separated from the rest doing her melismatic ad-libs on the chorus. When Snoop Dogg's verse begins, the Pussycat Dolls are shown walking towards him. During the breakdown, the girls dance while smoke is filled and halfway through the video, the floor turns on fire. The video ends with the group walking away.

Live performances 
Following the song's official release, it was included in concerts while supporting The Black Eyed Peas' Honda Civic Tour in the US and Canada. After supporting the Peas in the UK, they flew back to the US on June 30, 2006, and appeared on Good Morning America's Summer Concert Series to perform the song along with "Don't Cha" and "Stickwitu". On September 8, 2006, they performed the track at the annual international charity fundraiser event, Fashion Rocks with American rapper Jibbs. In 2020, a clip of performance went viral highlighting the tension between Scherzinger and Thornton. On November 9, 2006, the Pussycat Dolls performed the song in sparkly, sequined mini-dress on 2006 American Music Awards, in which they included routines involving chairs and pyrotechnics during their dance breakdown. The group initially performed as quintet, before being joined by Thornton in the final 30 seconds of the performance to do her ad-libs. The Daily Telegraph's Adam White wrote the group did a "messy rendition" of the song highlighting Thornton crashing the performance and Jessica Sutta falling of her chair. Thornton's vocals were described as "if she was Christina Aguilera stuck in a wind tunnel" adding she was singing loudly over Scherzinger's. Following the performance going viral in 2020, Thornton explained to Entertainment Tonight that travelling issues caused her to miss rehearsals and the only solution was for her to appear at the end and do her part. "Buttons" was also used as the opening number during their PCD World Tour (2006–07) and Aguilera's Back to Basics Tour (2007).

On August 2, 2008, the Pussycat Dolls performed "Buttons" and "When I Grow Up" at the opening of the MTV Asia Awards, where they also presented an award, in Malaysia. The song was included on their Doll Domination Tour and The Circus Starring Britney Spears (both in 2009); their dance routine consisted of "full of stomping and syncopated strutting." While reviewing their headlining tour, Colene McKessick of Press and Journal wrote that their performance of "Buttons" "[set] the crowd into a frenzy." Scherzinger performed the song as part of a Pussycat Dolls medley during concerts of her first solo tour in support of her debut studio album, Killer Love (2011).

On November 30, 2019, the Pussycat Dolls reunited on The X Factor: Celebrity finale, and performed a medley of "Buttons", "When I Grow Up", "Don't Cha", and their first new song in over a decade, "React". Shortly after, British media regulator Ofcom received 400 complaints from viewers who criticized band's revealing outfits and provocative choreography. On February 22, 2020, the group appeared on series sixteen of Ant & Dec's Saturday Night Takeaway, and performed "Buttons" as part of a medley with "Don't Cha", "Beep" and "React". The performance was set within the context of a comedy sketch where they poked fun at the controversy that aroused following their The X Factor: Celebrity. As part of the performance, a TV test card flashed up on screen from ITV reading "we're sorry for the disruption... we're working hard to fix the issue and will return to normal family-friendly, not at all sexy, uncontroversial programming soon." The test card was revealed to be a backdrop which the group jumped through.

Track listings and formats

 Australian and German maxi CD single
 "Buttons" (featuring Snoop Dogg) – 3:52
 "Buttons" (album version) – 3:46
 "Flirt" – 2:57
 "Buttons" (music video) – 4:04

 German CD single
 "Buttons" (featuring Snoop Dogg) – 3:52
 "Flirt" – 2:57

 UK CD single
 "Buttons" – 3:52
 "Don't Cha" (live) – 3:31

 US 12-inch vinyl
 "Buttons" (featuring Snoop Dogg) – 3:51
 "Buttons" (instrumental) – 3:46
 "Buttons" (a cappella) (featuring Snoop Dogg) – 3:48
 "Buttons" (album version) – 3:46
 "Buttons" (instrumental) – 3:46
 "Buttons" (a cappella) – 3:46

Credits and personnel 
Credits are adapted from the liner notes of PCD.

Mixing
 Mixed at Larrabee North (North Hollywood, Los Angeles).

Personnel

 JD Andrews – engineering
 Charlie Bisharat – electric violin
 Ariel Chobaz – assistant mix engineer
 Luis Conte – percussion
 Mike "Angry" Eleopoulos – engineering
 Ron Fair – production, vocal production
 Jamal "Polow da Don" Jones – songwriting, production, track arrangement and programming
 Sean Garrett – songwriting, production
 Tal Herzberg – co-production, engineering, Pro Tools
 Dave "Hard Drive" Pensado – mixing
 Jason Perry – songwriting
 Nicole Scherzinger – songwriting
 Young Smoke – vocal production

Charts

Weekly charts

Year-end charts

Decade-end charts

Certifications and sales

Release history

See also 
 List of number-one hits of 2006 (Austria)
 List of number-one singles from the 2000s (New Zealand)
 List of Billboard Hot Dance Club Play number ones of 2006
 List of Billboard Mainstream Top 40 number-one songs of 2006

Notes

References

External links
 Official website

The Pussycat Dolls songs
Snoop Dogg songs
2005 songs
2006 singles
Songs written by Sean Garrett
Songs written by Polow da Don
Songs written by Jason Perry (singer)
Songs written by Nicole Scherzinger
Song recordings produced by Polow da Don
Number-one singles in Austria
Number-one singles in New Zealand
Music videos directed by Francis Lawrence